, real name  (August 30, 1965 – October 17, 2014) was a Japanese actress. She won the award for best actress at the 11th Yokohama Film Festival for A Sign Days.

Death
Nakagawa died on October 17, 2014, from endometrial cancer at the age of 49.

Filmography
The Silk Road (1988)
A Sign Days (1989)
Godzilla vs. King Ghidorah (1991)
Camp de aimashou (1995)
Cure (1997)
Code geass (2006)

References

External links

1965 births
2014 deaths
Actresses from Tokyo
Japanese film actresses
20th-century Japanese actresses
21st-century Japanese actresses
Deaths from cancer in Japan
Deaths from endometrial cancer